Pedro Neves may refer to:

 Pedro Luís Neves (born 1955), Portuguese composer
 Pedro Miguel Neves (born 1968), Portuguese basketball player